Comsat(s) may refer to:

Technology
Communications satellite
COMSAT (Communications Satellite Corporation)
COMSAT mobile communications, a telecommunications company, formerly a business unit of Communications Satellite Corporation
Commission on Science and Technology for Sustainable Development in the South (COMSATS), an inter-governmental organization
COMSATS University, a university in Pakistan
The name of the associated daemon for the biff mail notification system.

See also
Comcast, a global telecommunications conglomerate, owns Xfinity and NBCUniversal
The Comsat Angels, an English post-punk band